The 1966–67 Albanian National Championship was the 29th season of the Albanian National Championship, the top professional league for association football clubs, since its establishment in 1930.

Overview
It was contested by 12 teams, and Dinamo Tirana won the championship. This championship is not officially recognized by UEFA.

Title of shame 

It was 24 June 1967. Tirana and Partizani played their derby of the 19th round of 1967 Championship . Match had just been played in full and finished 2:1. Fans were peacefully leaving stands and, as players had already left the pitch and were heading towards dressing rooms, two of opposite players have just had a verbal exchange which ended there and then. 

It was a huge surprise to see the paper headlines the next morning: "Due to direct decision of AFA, Tirana and Partizani forfeit the match 0:3, are deducted 3 points each and will thereafter lose by default remaining matches!"
Many were asking: "what went wrong, match was played in the pitch, it produced lots of emotions and fans acknowledged the final result. What did teams do to receive such a harsh treatment?"

However, it became clear days after: the decision to expel both clubs was taken directly from Ministry of Affairs and passed to AFA for execution. Since Partizani was out of title fight due to a huge point gap and the only way that Dinamo could get the title was punishing Tirana - table leaders at the moment, they finally found the excuse in that minor verbal exchange two players had after the match. Truth is they just couldn't support the fact that KF Tirana was about to achieve the 3rd title in a row, instead of Partizani or Dinamo. The day championship trophy was handed, Skënder Jareci, the manager of Dinamo, wouldn't take it on the traditional lap of honour, citing that Dinamo didn't truly deserve that title!

By forfeiting that match and losing the subsequent 3 remaining matches, Dinamo would automatically gain enough points to overtake Tirana and win the title. It was a disgrace for Albanian football, such that even UEFA still refrains to recognize the champions Dinamo for that year. The next season, because of the disqualification farce, Dinamo were denied entry to the European Cup by UEFA; their opponents, Braunschweig, received a walkover and eventually reached the quarter-finals.

League table

Results

References

Albania - List of final tables (RSSSF)

Kategoria Superiore seasons
1
Albania